The Advocate: A Missing Body (lit. "Angry Lawyer") is a 2015 South Korean courtroom thriller-comedy film co-written and directed by Heo Jong-ho.

Plot
Byeon Ho-sung is a hotshot lawyer at a big law firm; with a nearly 100% win rate, his life motto is "Winning is justice, and I am the winner." After Byeon wins a lawsuit for a large conglomerate pharmaceutical company, its chairman Moon Ji-hoon asks him to defend Moon's chauffeur Kim Jeong-hwan, who is suspected to have murdered a female college student named Han Min-jeong. A pool of blood was found at the crime scene where Kim was apprehended, but a body has not been found and there are no witnesses.

Kim insists that he and the victim were dating, but passionate rookie prosecutor Jin Sun-min believes that he was stalking Han. Just when Byeon is close to successfully contradicting Jin's claims and winning the case as he always does, his client abruptly confesses in court on the last day of the trial that he killed Han. Furious at his humiliation and even accused of tampering with evidence, Byeon uncharacteristically embarks on a search for the truth and teams up with Jin. But as he digs deeper, Byeon begins to uncover clues that may link the case back to Moon.

Cast
Lee Sun-kyun as Byeon Ho-sung
Kim Go-eun as Jin Sun-min
Im Won-hee as Office manager Park
Jang Hyun-sung as Moon Ji-hoon
Choi Jae-woong as Kim Jeong-hwan 
Kim Yoon-hye as Han Min-jeong
Park Ji-young as Representative Joo
Choi Kyu-hwan as Department head Yoo
Im Cheol-hyeong as Subsection chief Yoon 
Lee Jun-hyeok as Gil-dong 
Bae Yoo-ram as Yong-sik 
Min Jin-woong as Gap-soo 
Lee Jong-gu as Kim Ik-tae 
Hong Sung-deok as Kim Man-seok
Park Soo-eun as Se-young
Kwak In-joon as Chief public prosecutor 
Hwang So-hee as Ha Yoo-ri 
Joo Seok-tae as David Lee

Reception
By its third weekend, the film had earned .

References

External links
 
 

2015 films
2010s comedy thriller films
2010s mystery thriller films
South Korean mystery thriller films
South Korean comedy thriller films
South Korean courtroom films
2015 comedy films
2010s Korean-language films
2010s South Korean films